Danger & Eggs is an American animated series created by Mike Owens and Shadi Petosky that premiered on Amazon Video on June 30, 2017. The show focuses on the adventures of a "gender-free female lesbian child and her giant large-gamete friend," as described by Petosky. Petosky stated that she, and the show's cast, wanted to be overt about LGBT representation rather than having "metaphors and hidden symbology" within the series.

Plot
D. D. Danger, an imaginative thrill seeker, and her best friend, a lawful good, safety-first anthropomorphic egg named Phillip, experience a series of enjoyably chaotic adventures as "they do stuff".

Cast

Main
 Aidy Bryant as D.D. Danger
 Eric Knobel as Phillip

Recurring
 Shadi Petosky as Pigeon Lady/Duncan 
 Stephanie Beatriz as Sheriff Luke/Captain Banjo Kid 
 Kimberly Brooks as Kimmy
 Parvesh Cheena as Gomez
 Jessica DiCicco as Felicia
 Ben Diskin as Tappy
 Keith Ferguson as BL1P/Crackers
 Jasika Nicole as Reina. She is a creative femme girl.
 Angelica Ross as the mayor 
 Brennan Murray as Tyronius
 Michael Ritchie as Corporate Raider Jim. He is business executive who has two fathers

Guest
 Kate Berlant as Rhonda the Realtor
 River Butcher as Sweet 
 Felicia Day as Francesca
 Cameron Esposito as Rad 
 Tyler Ford as Milo, non-binary musician
 Chris Hardwick as Pete Peril 
 Jazz Jennings as Zadie. She is a transgender teenage singer.
 Kate Micucci as herself
 Lori Petty as Ruelle/Madame Aubergine
 Dannah Phirman as Gale/Lint Kid/Hamster
 Jonah Ray as Security Person/Jonah
 Sam Riegel as Phillip's Brother
 Michaela Watkins as Life Coach Nancy
 Mary Elizabeth Winstead as Trix Blixon
 'Weird Al' Yankovic as Polka Sven 
 Charlyne Yi as Layla
 Laura Zak as Troll

Production
Petosky told NewNowNext in 2017 that the show tries to be inclusive as possible without having crushes or romantic relationships at all, calling it a "challenge" without reverting to a stereotype, noting that she and the show's crew wanted to display "innocent LGBTQ friendships, before the age of romantic connections," without the use of metaphors. She also pushed to have an episode on Pride which wasn't buried in an allegory and stated that there were "queer people in every aspect of production.” In an interview with Nerdist, Petosky said that she and the crew were aiming to create a series "that both kids and parents could enjoy together for same reasons." Mike Owens, the show's co-creator, Aidy Bryant, and Eric Knobel spoke to Phillip as a character and how the show treated him, saying it was different than other shows. Nicole, who voices Reina, argued that the show is a "wonderful tool" to help get kids talking about LGBTQ issues at "a young age" while Beatriz, who voices two characters, said that she was astounded by the season finale, saying it has a "huge message to give to a child."

Petosky told journalists for Insider in June 2021 that she experienced many challenges in production, noting there were "little arguments, and battles, and suspensions" throughout production, and having to fight to get the word "Pride" in the show with the help of GLAAD.

Episodes

Reception

Danger & Eggs has received positive reviews. Trish Benedix of NewNowNext described the series as the "queerest show on television," noting that it includes "trans youth, gay dads...[and] a lesbian folk duo" and noted that many of the show's characters are "voiced by LGBT talent." Nico Lang of The Daily Dot called the series an "acid trip worth taking" which can appeal to fans of Adventure Time and called the show "fast, wild, and inventive," constantly throwing new jokes and characters "at the audience." Lang also described the series "consistently warm and witty," even referencing shows like Rick and Morty, praised the voice cast, and called it "quietly groundbreaking." Donnie Lederer of Nerdist noted that the series confronts water slides, underground labs, and issues like "politics, gender, and sexual identity," remaining watchable to adults and kids at the same time.

Autostraddle reviewers lauded the series for its LGBT representation such as the non-binary character Milo (voiced by agender activist and model Tyler Ford), and the season finale taking place during a Pride festival. Emily Ashby of Common Sense Media called the series a "hilarious, adventurous buddy comedy [that] will delight kids," praising its "bold animation" and the enthusiasm of characters to live their lives to the fullest and remind "kids of the value of taking chances and trying new things." Robert Hutton of Screenrant described the series as a family-oriented series which went "under the radar" and said that it could appeal to fans of series like Steven Universe. Owl Fisher and Fox Fisher of The Guardian praised the series for its transgender characters and other LGBTQ characters, and said that it is a "great choice for families to watch together" while showing LGBTQ characters in a "really simple and normalised way." In June 2021, journalist Abbey White described the series as one of the recent "overtly queer" series, noting She-Ra and the Princesses of Power and Steven Universe as other examples.

Awards and nominations

References

External links
 
 

Amazon Prime Video original programming
Animated television series by Amazon Studios
2010s American animated television series
2017 American television series debuts
2017 American television series endings
American children's animated comedy television series
English-language television shows
2010s American LGBT-related animated television series
Amazon Prime Video children's programming
American LGBT-related web series
Television shows set in Minnesota
Television series by Amazon Studios